Limerick is a hamlet in Jefferson County, New York, United States. Limerick had a post office until June 1, 1998; it still has its own ZIP code, 13657.

References

Hamlets in Jefferson County, New York
Hamlets in New York (state)